The Clear River is a river in the U.S. state of Rhode Island. There are five dams along the river's length.

Course
The river rises from a swamp southeast of Wallum Lake in Burrillville. From there, the river flows roughly east past the villages of Pascoag and Harrisville. At Oakland, the river converges with the Chepachet River to form the Branch River.

Crossings
Below is a list of all crossings over the Clear River. The list starts at the headwaters and goes downstream.
Burrillville
East Wallum Lake Road
Warner Lane
Laurel Ridge Avenue
North Road
Centennial Street
Chapel Street (RI 107)
Railroad Avenue
Chapel Street (RI 107)
Hill Road
Sherman Farm Road (RI 98)
East Avenue (RI 107)
Broncos Highway (RI 102)
Victory Highway

See also
List of rivers in Rhode Island

References
Maps from the United States Geological Survey

Rivers of Providence County, Rhode Island
Rivers of Rhode Island
Tributaries of Providence River